The 2007 All-SEC football team consists of American football players selected to the All-Southeastern Conference (SEC) chosen by the Associated Press (AP) and the conference coaches for the 2007 college football season.

The LSU Tigers won the conference, beating the Tennessee Volunteers 21 to 14 in the SEC Championship Game. The Tigers then won a national championship, defeating the Big Ten champion Ohio State Buckeyes 38 to 24 in the BCS National Championship Game.

Florida quarterback Tim Tebow, AP selection, won Heisman Trophy, the first sophomore to do so. He also won the AP SEC Offensive Player of the Year. Arkansas running back Darren McFadden, a unanimous selection by both the AP and the coaches and repeat winner of the Doak Walker Award as the nation's top running back, was the coaches Offensive Player of the Year. LSU defensive tackle Glenn Dorsey, a unanimous selection by both the AP and the coaches, was the unanimous Defensive Player of the Year. He also won the Lombardi Award and Nagurski Trophy.

Offensive selections

Quarterbacks
 Tim Tebow*, Florida (AP-1, Coaches-1)
 Andre Woodson, Kentucky (AP-2, Coaches-2)

Running backs
 Darren McFadden†, Arkansas (AP-1, Coaches-1)
 Knowshon Moreno, Georgia (AP-1, Coaches-1)
Felix Jones, Arkansas (AP-2, Coaches-2)
Arian Foster, Tennessee (AP-2)
Jacob Hester, LSU (Coaches-2)

Wide receivers
 Kenny McKinley, South Carolina (AP-1, Coaches-1)
Earl Bennett, Vanderbilt (AP-1, Coaches-1)
Percy Harvin, Florida (AP-2, Coaches-2)
Lucas Taylor, Tennessee (AP-2)
D. J. Hall, Alabama (Coaches-2)

Centers
Jonathan Luigs, Arkansas (AP-1, Coaches-1)
Fernando Velasco, Georgia (AP-2, Coaches-2)

Guards
Chris Williams, Vanderbilt (AP-1, Coaches-1)
Anthony Parker, Tennessee (AP-1, Coaches-1)
Robert Felton, Arkansas (AP-1, Coaches-1)
Herman Johnson, LSU (AP-2, Coaches-1)
Nate Garner, Arkansas (AP-2, Coaches-2)
Jason Leger, Kentucky (AP-2)
Mitch Petrus, Arkansas (Coaches-2)
Jim Tartt, Florida (Coaches-2)

Tackles
Michael Oher, Ole Miss (AP-1, Coaches-1)
Andre Smith, Alabama (AP-1, Coaches-1)
Eric Young, Tennessee (AP-2)
Ciron Black, LSU (Coaches-2)
Garry Williams, Kentucky (Coaches-2)
Carlton Medder, Florida (Coaches-2)
Michael Brown, Miss. St. (Coaches-2)

Tight ends
 Jacob Tamme*, Kentucky (AP-1, Coaches-1)
Cornelius Ingram, Florida (AP-2, Coaches-2)

Defensive selections

Defensive ends
 Greg Hardy, Ole Miss (AP-1, Coaches-1) 
 Wallace Gilberry, Alabama (AP-1, Coaches-1)
 Quentin Groves, Auburn (AP-2, Coaches-1)
 Eric Norwood, South Carolina (AP-2, Coaches-1)
 Titus Brown, Miss. St (AP-2, Coaches-2)
 Derrick Harvey, Florida (Coaches-2)

Defensive tackles 
Glenn Dorsey†, LSU (AP-1, Coaches-1)
Geno Atkins, Georgia (AP-1)
Pat Sims, Auburn (AP-1)
Marcus Harrison, Arkansas (AP-2)
Peria Jerry, Ole Miss (AP-2)
Jeremy Jarmon, Kentucky (Coaches-2)

Linebackers
Wesley Woodyard#, Kentucky (AP-1, Coaches-1)
Ali Highsmith#, LSU (AP-1, Coaches-1)
Jerod Mayo, Tennessee (AP-1, Coaches-1)
Brandon Spikes, Florida (AP-1, Coaches-1)
Jonathan Goff, Vanderbilt (AP-2, Coaches-2)
Rico McCoy, Tennessee (AP-2, Coaches-2)
Daniel Ellerbe, Georgia (AP-2, Coaches-2)
Darry Beckwith, LSU (Coaches-2)
Jamar Chaney, Miss. St. (Coaches-2)

Cornerbacks
 Chevis Jackson, LSU  (AP-1, Coaches-1) 
 D. J. Moore, Vanderbilt (AP-1, Coaches-2) 
 Captain Munnerlyn, South Carolina (AP-2, Coaches-1) 
 Simeon Castille, Alabama (Coaches-1)

Safeties 
 Craig Steltz, LSU (AP-1, Coaches-1)
 Rashad Johnson, Alabama (AP-1, Coaches-1)
Derek Pegues, Miss. St. (AP-1, Coaches-2)
Jonathan Hefney, Tennessee (Coaches-1)
Michael Grant, Arkansas (AP-2, Coaches-2)
Emanuel Cook, South Carolina (AP-2, Coaches-2)
Eric Berry, Tennessee (AP-2, Coaches-2)
Patrick Lee, Auburn (AP-2)
Matt Hewitt, Arkansas (AP-2)

Special teams

Kickers
 Colt David, LSU (AP-1, Coaches-1)
Daniel Lincoln, Tennessee (AP-2, Coaches-2)

Punters
 Patrick Fisher, LSU (AP-1, Coaches-1)
Ryan Shoemaker, Auburn (AP-2, Coaches-2)
Britton Colquitt, Tennessee (Coaches-2)

All purpose/return specialist
Felix Jones, Arkansas (AP-1, Coaches-1)
Percy Harvin, Florida (AP-1)
Brandon James, Florida (AP-2, Coaches-2)

Key
Bold: Consensus first-team selection by both the coaches and AP
AP: Associated Press
Coaches: Selected by the SEC coaches
*Unanimous selection of AP
#Unanimous selection of Coaches
†Unanimous selection of both AP and Coaches

See also
2007 College Football All-America Team

References

All-Southeastern Conference
All-SEC football teams